General Dunham may refer to:

Bill Dunham (born 1961), Royal Marines brigadier general
Thomas H. Dunham (1840–1925), Union Army colonel later awarded the honorary grade of brevet brigadier general
William D. Dunham (1920–1990), U.S. Air Force brigadier general